"Crisis on Earth-X" is the fourth Arrowverse crossover event, featuring episodes of the live-action television series Supergirl, Arrow, The Flash, and Legends of Tomorrow on The CW. The crossover began on November 27, 2017, with Supergirl and Arrow, and concluded on November 28, with The Flash and Legends of Tomorrow. In "Crisis on Earth-X", Barry Allen and Iris West's friends come to Central City for their wedding, only for the proceedings to be interrupted by interlopers from the analogous universe of Earth-X, where the Axis powers claimed victory in World War II.

Development for a crossover of the four series began in December 2016 after the release of the previous crossover, "Invasion!". The premise and title of the crossover were revealed in September 2017 as production on the episodes began; elements from the animated web series Freedom Fighters: The Ray were part of the crossover, including the live-action appearance of Raymond Terrill / The Ray, the Freedom Fighters, and the New Reichsmen. A subsequent crossover aired the following year, titled "Elseworlds".

Plot

Part 1 
A Nazi regime rules the parallel world of Earth-X, where an archer known as Dark Arrow is the Führer and leader of the cabal known as the New Reichsmen. He seizes a temporal gateway from the Freedom Fighters, which enables travel to other universes. On Earth-1, Barry Allen and Iris West's friends, including Kara Danvers and Alex Danvers from Earth-38, come to Central City for Barry and Iris's wedding. Harry Wells, Cisco Ramon, and Caitlin Snow develop a serum to separate the Firestorm matrix from Martin Stein and Jefferson Jackson. However, Jefferson is reluctant to give up being Firestorm, while Stein is thrilled at the prospect of being able to live a normal life with his family. Oliver Queen re-proposes to Felicity Smoak, but she is hesitant about marrying him. The wedding ceremony is interrupted by invaders from Earth-X led by Dark Arrow, his Kryptonian wife Overgirl, and the Earth-X analog of Prometheus. After Kara injures Overgirl, and Alex and Sara Lance capture Prometheus, the Nazis retreat. Dark Arrow and Overgirl, who are doppelgängers of Oliver and Kara respectively, discuss their next step with Eobard Thawne, Barry's speedster nemesis who was previously presumed dead.

Part 2 
In S.T.A.R. Labs, Prometheus reveals himself as Tommy Merlyn's Earth-X doppelgänger, and taunts Oliver before taking a suicide pill out of loyalty to the Führer. Harry reveals that, through his exploration of the multiverse, he discovered that Earth-X is a dystopian world where World War II was not won by the Allied forces. Dark Arrow, Overgirl, and Thawne steal an experimental sub-light generator, the Prism, from a research company. Oliver's team, along with Harry, Killer Frost (Caitlin Snow), Cisco, and Mick Rory, are held captive at S.T.A.R. Labs after the Nazi forces occupy it. Oliver, Barry, Sara, Martin, Jefferson, and Alex are taken to a concentration camp on Earth-X, while Kara is moved to S.T.A.R. Labs. Overgirl is dying from disproportionate solar irradiance in her heart, and Dark Arrow plans to use the Prism, powered by S.T.A.R. Labs' particle accelerator, to create artificial red sunlight that can weaken both Karas' invulnerability, allowing Thawne to transplant Kara's heart to Overgirl.

Part 3 
In the concentration camp, the heroes are rescued from execution at the hands of SS-Sturmbannführer Quentin Lance by Ray Terrill and Leo Snart, Leonard Snart's doppelgänger. Thawne prepares to operate on both Overgirl and Kara, and Iris and Felicity work to rescue their friends at S.T.A.R. Labs. General Winn Schott, the commander of the Freedom Fighters, is determined to strand Dark Arrow and Overgirl on Earth-1 by destroying the temporal gateway. While posing as Dark Arrow, Oliver discovers that the Nazis possess a doomsday device in the form of a timeship called Wellenreiter, a militarized equivalent of the Legends' Waverider. Oliver allows the timeship to enter Earth-1 to avoid jeopardizing his cover, but he is ultimately exposed when he refuses to kill Felicity's Earth-X doppelgänger, a concentration camp prisoner. The heroes struggle against both the Freedom Fighters' Red Tornado, deployed by Schott as a failsafe, and the Nazi forces, and Martin opens the gateway at the cost of being mortally wounded.

Part 4 
The heroes return to Earth-1, and Iris, Felicity, Kara, and the others are rescued by the returned heroes and the Waverider crew. Jefferson is also affected by Martin's injuries, so Martin uses the serum to separate the Firestorm matrix, dying from his wounds. Jefferson tells Martin's family of his fate; they, along with the Legends and Barry's team are devastated by Martin's death. His death spurs the heroes to declare war on Earth-X's Nazi forces. When the Nazis attack Central City, the heroes counter their assault. Harry, at the helm of the Waverider, destroys the Wellenreiter after the heroes disable its shield. Barry spares Thawne and allows him to escape; Thawne vows to return. During battle with Kara, Overgirl's solar radiation goes nuclear and Kara carries her into space, where her body explodes, killing her; Oliver kills a grief-stricken Dark Arrow soon after. After Martin's funeral, Kara and Alex return to Earth-38, Ray returns to Earth-X, and Leo decides to temporarily remain with the Legends. John Diggle, an ordained minister, officiates Barry and Oliver's weddings with Iris and Felicity, respectively.

Cast and characters

Main and recurring

 Note: Despite being credited, Katie McGrath and Odette Annable do not appear in the Supergirl episode; David Ramsey, Willa Holland, Katie Cassidy and Paul Blackthorne do not appear in the Arrow episode; and Jesse L. Martin does not appear in The Flash episode.

Guest

Supergirl
 Jesse L. Martin as Joe West
 Keiynan Lonsdale as Wally West / Kid Flash
 Jessica Parker Kennedy as a caterer
 Danielle Nicolet as Cecile Horton
 Patrick Sabongui as David Singh
 William Katt as the minister

Arrow
 Colin Donnell as Tommy Merlyn / Prometheus (Earth-X)

The Flash
 Paul Blackthorne as SS Sturmbannführer Quentin Lance (Earth-X)

Legends of Tomorrow
 David Ramsey as John Diggle
 Susanna Thompson voices the timeship Wellenreiters A.I.

Production

Development

Planning for the yearly Arrowverse crossover began in December 2016, with Arrow showrunner Wendy Mericle saying, "We actually sort of do, believe it or not, have a concept for what we want to do for next year's crossover. It's crazy." By February 2017, planning began for a true four-way series crossover. Because each series was renewed for an additional season, the producers could plan production schedules to incorporate the crossover. Executive producer Andrew Kreisberg said, "One of the big things we learned from "Heroes Join Forces", which made "Invasion!" slightly easier, was building in shut-down days, where shows just went dark. The single hardest factor in doing the crossovers is actors' availability because the shows keep going on. You're basically juggling four shows' worth of schedules." That May, The CW president Mark Pedowitz confirmed that there were no plans to incorporate Black Lightning in the crossover, as it was not part of the Arrowverse at that time and was scheduled to debut in the middle of the 2017–18 television season.

In September 2017, it was revealed that the title of the crossover would be "Crisis on Earth-X" and that Ray Terrill (The Ray) would make his live-action debut in the Arrowverse, ahead of appearing in the animated web series, Freedom Fighters: The Ray, along with other characters and concepts from that series. Russell Tovey also voices the character in Freedom Fighters. In 2019, executive producer Marc Guggenheim call "Crisis on Earth-X" the "gold standard" of the yearly crossovers.

Writing
In June 2017, Guggenheim noted that it would be hard to top the threat of aliens in "Invasion!", so this crossover would aim to "increase the emotional stakes and the emotional payoffs". The following month, Mericle added that the crossover would be "very much rooted in the DCU." At the Television Critics Association press tour in August 2017, Pedowitz said that the crossover would involve romance, with Berlanti adding, "our way of making the show bigger this year was to go even more personal, so it's a big life event for a few different people on the show. There are many life events that happen." Arrow showrunner Wendy Mericle described the story as one where the character of Oliver Queen "explores the question of true love". In September 2017, in a statement revealing the crossover's title, Guggenheim and Kreisberg said that the crossover was conceived "to be evocative of the annual Justice League/Justice Society [comic book series] crossovers we grew up with and looked forward to as kids." The story of the crossover was conceived by Kreisberg and Guggenheim. The teleplay for Supergirls episode was written by showrunners Robert Rovner and Jessica Queller, Arrows by Mericle and Ben Sokolowski, The Flashs by showrunner Todd Helbing, and Legends of Tomorrows by showrunner Phil Klemmer and Keto Shimizu.

Filming
Filming of the four episodes began on September 22, 2017. Supergirls episode was directed by Larry Teng, Arrow by James Bamford, The Flashs by Dermott Downs, and Legend of Tomorrows by Gregory Smith.

Music
Blake Neely, primary composer of all four series, composed the two-and-a-half-hour score for the crossover in eight days at The Bridge Recording Studio in Glendale, California. La-La Land Records released the soundtrack physically on June 5, 2018, in a limited run. WaterTower Music also released it digitally on June 15, 2018.

"Free Stress Test" by Professor Murder, "Justice" by Misun, "All Eyes On You" by St. Lucia, "By the Stream" by Tom Hillock & Nicolas Boscovic, "Love Is Emotional" by Neil Finn, "String Quartet No. 62 in C Major, Op. 76, No. 3, Hob. III:77, "Emperor": II. Poco Adagio, Cantabile" by Kodály Quartet, and "Runnin' Home to You" (from the musical crossover episode "Duet") performed by Melissa Benoist are heard in the first part of the crossover but not included in the soundtrack.

Marketing

Comic artist Phil Jimenez created a custom cover for the event, which invokes the cover design of the Justice League of America #207, the 20th Annual Justice League of America/Justice Society of America crossover. Promotional trailers for the event were released throughout November, before the full trailer was released on November 20.

Release

Broadcast
The crossover began with Supergirl and Arrow on November 27, 2017, and concluded on The Flash and Legends of Tomorrow on November 28, all on The CW. Arrow, which normally aired on Thursdays at 9pm, moved to Monday at 9pm for the crossover and did not air an additional episode on November 30. Pedowitz stated that they decided to have the crossover occur over two nights, as opposed to the four nights of "Invasion!", because The Flash and Legends of Tomorrow were already paired together on The CW's schedule, and "it would be better and tighter in terms of storytelling to make it like a two-night, four-hour miniseries. We thought this was a tight, concise way of doing it." Guggenheim added, "We're really approaching this big four-part event as two back-to-back two-hour movies, and I think when you look at it through that lens, it becomes less important for the Supergirl episode to feel like a Supergirl episode and the Arrow episode to feel like an Arrow episode, which was always our approach in the past."

Home media
All four episodes and the behind-the-scenes featurette "Inside the Crossover: Crisis on Earth-X", were released on Blu-ray and DVD in Region 1 along with the rest of Arrows sixth season on August 14, 2018, with The Flashs fourth season on August 23, with Supergirls third season on September 18, and with Legends of Tomorrows third season on September 25. The four episodes were released together on a separate DVD on September 3, 2018, in Region 2, and September 5 in Region 4. Unlike the previous crossover, "Invasion!", the episodes of "Crisis on Earth-X" were not released as a seamless cut; this was due to "union rules regarding credit" according to Marc Guggenheim.

Reception

Ratings

Critical response
Speaking about the crossover as a whole, Jesse Schedeen of IGN felt that "ultimately, 'Crisis on Earth-X' set a higher standard for what these crossovers can achieve than last year's 'Invasion!. Scott Mendelson of Forbes said the "Crisis on Earth-X" was "a better Justice League movie than the actual Justice League movie and in many ways was better or at least equal to the best MCU crossover events." Rob Leane of Den of Geek thought the crossover was the "best crossover yet", saying, "It offers fresh ideas alongside heaps of fan service, and the special effects wizards behind the scenes make the limited TV budget feel like that of a massive movie."

Supergirl
The review aggregator website Rotten Tomatoes reported a 93% approval rating, based on 14 reviews for the episode. The website's critical consensus reads, "Kicking off an Arrowverse crossover event, "Crisis On Earth-X, Part 1" offers viewers a fun outing with quirky characters preceding the action and tragedy to come."

Schedeen gave the Supergirl episode an 8.1 out of 10. While he felt that the Supergirl episode "clearly isn't in much of a hurry to get where it's going", Schedeen said it did "prove to be a very entertaining start to the crossover." Ultimately, the episode "did, however, make the most of this massive pairing of heroes, delivering an endless stream of banter and character drama before transitioning into an epic battle royale. There are certainly worse ways to kick off a crossover." Caroline Siede at The A.V. Club awarded the episode a "B+" rating. She said the episode "isn't a particularly great episode of Supergirl, but then again it isn't really trying to be. And as the first hour of an ambitious four-part Arrowverse movie, it's hard to ask for anything more." Kayti Burt of Collider gave the episode 4 out of 5 stars, stating, "I was wildly impressed with the storytelling ambitious 'Crisis on Earth-X' has shown so far. There were some narrative missteps, but this is like nothing we have ever seen on-screen before: a true comic book-style crossover event that ties hours of superhero serials together in one epic story."

Arrow
Rotten Tomatoes reported an 89% approval rating, based on 9 reviews for the episode.

Schedeen gave the Arrow episode a 7 out of 10, saying that the episode "struggled to find that balance between character drama and plot progression, as well as in establishing stakes big enough to support such a massive crossover in the first place. But for all its flaws, at least this episode still included some entertaining moments and a generally strong portrayal of its twisted villains." The A.V. Clubs Allison Shoemaker gave the episode a "B" rating. She thought it was "difficult to judge how successful this episode of Arrow is because it's neither an episode of Arrow nor a complete story," but concluded, "it's a lot of fun, kind of dumb, and just not as exciting as what came before. Someone has to check those boxes and set up what comes next, and it seems that this time, Arrow drew the 'event' short straw."

The Flash
Rotten Tomatoes reported an 89% approval rating, based on 9 reviews for the episode.

Schedeen awarded The Flashs episode a 9.2 out of 10, noting that while part 1 had "a slow start" and part 2 gave "a fairly underwhelming follow-up... the crossover finally seemed to click" in part 3. Scott Von Doviak at The A.V. Club gave the episode a "B+" rating, stating "Even a lesser installment like this one features the spectacle of the Flash and The Ray battling the Red Tornado, as well as the appealing non-superpowered Nazi-fighting team of Iris and Felicity. For the most part, I've felt like a kid coming home with a fresh stack of comics, and I can think of no higher praise than that." Mike Cecchini of Den of Geek gave it 4 out of 5 stars. He wrote that while mirror universe Nazis' don't make for the most nuanced of villains, and when you're using concentration camp imagery, well, you'd better make sure you're not being exploitative," The Flash episode "completely embraces its lunacy in ways that I don't even think those first two chapters dreamed of."

Legends of Tomorrow
Schedeen gave the final episode an 8.5 out of 10 rating. The episode "didn't have quite the urgency it needed during the final showdown between good and evil," but "did make the most of Professor Stein's heroic sacrifice and its emotional fallout." Oliver Sava of The A.V. Club gave the episode an "A" rating, stating "No piece of live-action superhero media has captured the feeling of a comic-book crossover event like Crisis On Earth-X. With a huge cast of characters, a major death, and a final scene taking big heroes in bold new directions, Crisis delivers the thrills, the twists, and the inspiration that should come from a superhero story with this massive scope." Jim Dandy from Den of Geek rated the episode 5 out of 5 stars. He wrote, "This year's was an objectively wonderful hour of DC television, but it also moved the season's story along for Legends in a meaningful way, and provided significant character development for Jax and Sara. It gave Franz Drameh and Victor Garber a chance to stretch their acting wings, and it closed out a timely, wall-to-wall entertaining four hours of television." Collider's Carla Day gave the Legends episode 5 stars out of 5, saying the crossover was "leaps and bounds better than any of the previous crossovers." She went on to say that "It set the standard high for all future crossovers in the story, character interactions, and fight scenes."

Notes

References

External links

 "Crisis on Earth-X" Part 1, Part 2, Part 3, and Part 4 on IMDb

2017 American television episodes
American LGBT-related television episodes
Arrow (TV series) episodes
Arrowverse crossover episodes
Dystopian television episodes
The Flash (2014 TV series) episodes
Supergirl (TV series) episodes
Television episodes about androids
Television episodes about anti-LGBT sentiment
Television episodes about artificial intelligence
Television episodes about cyborgs
Television episodes about funerals
Television episodes about invasions
Television episodes about Nazis
Television episodes about parallel universes
Television episodes about prisoners of war
Television episodes about rebellions
Television episodes about revenge
Television episodes about sacrifices
Television episodes about suicide
Television episodes about the aftermath of The Holocaust
Television episodes about The Holocaust
Television episodes about weddings
Television episodes about World War II alternate histories
Television episodes written by Andrew Kreisberg
Television episodes written by Marc Guggenheim